Parliamentary cretinism is a pejorative for the belief that a socialist society can be achieved by peaceful, parliamentary means. It is perpetuated by parliamentarians through their rhetoric that ignore real-word situations (e.g. class struggle). The term, which was cited as a malady,  is said to confine adherents to an imaginary world, keeping them from the knowledge and realities of the external world.

Concept 
The term parliamentary cretinism was originally coined by Karl Marx in chapter five of his Eighteenth Brumaire of Louis Bonaparte, published in 1852 following Louis Napoleon's coup d'état in France. Marx and Engels considered this a fatal delusion for the socialist movement, believing it would only waste time and allow reactionary forces to grow stronger. Marx, particularly, held the view that parliaments are indirectly representing the interests of classes but resolve problems superficially, with its politics ideologically displaced and abstracted from social conditions. This means, for Marx, that parliamentary cretinism creates an imaginary world without sense, memory, and understanding of the real world. This condition perpetuates parliamentarism by defending it against the proletariat through the destruction of the Parliament itself to reinforce the executive branch. 

In the words of Friedrich Engels:

References

Communist theory
Political slurs